is a national highway connecting Nagoya, Aichi Prefecture, and Gifu, Gifu Prefecture in Japan. The route follows the old Minoji, a 17th-century trade route that connected the Nakasendō and the Tōkaidō.

Route data
Length: 
Origin: Nagoya (originates at junction with Route 1)
Terminus: Gifu (ends at Junction with Route 21)
Major cities: Ichinomiya

Overlapping sections

From Atsuta-ku, Nagoya (Atsuta Shrine South intersection) to Naka-ku, Nagoya (Nichigin-mae intersection): Route 19
From Ginan (Ginan IC) to Gifu (Akanabe-Hongo intersection): Routes 21 and 156

History
4 December 1952 - First Class National Highway 22 (from Nagoya to Gifu)
1 April 1965 - General National Highway 22 (from Nagoya to Gifu)

Intersects with

Aichi Prefecture
Routes 1 and 247
Route 19
Route 302
Route 155
Gifu Prefecture
Routes 21 and 156
Route 157

References

022
Roads in Aichi Prefecture
Roads in Gifu Prefecture